Paul Gibbert (November 26, 1898 – December 30, 1967) was a German politician of the Christian Democratic Union (CDU) and former member of the German Bundestag.

Life 
After the end of the Second World War, he participated in the founding of the CDU in Rhineland-Palatinate in 1945. Gibbert was a member of the Consultative State Assembly from 1946 to 1947 and then a member of the Rhineland-Palatinate State Parliament until 1951. He was a member of the German Bundestag from its first election in 1949 until his death. There he represented, always directly elected, the constituency of Cochem.

Literature

References

1898 births
1967 deaths
Members of the Bundestag for Rhineland-Palatinate
Members of the Bundestag 1965–1969
Members of the Bundestag 1961–1965
Members of the Bundestag 1957–1961
Members of the Bundestag 1953–1957
Members of the Bundestag 1949–1953
Members of the Bundestag for the Christian Democratic Union of Germany
Members of the Landtag of Rhineland-Palatinate